The 326th Bombardment Squadron is an inactive United States Air Force unit. Its last was assigned to the 4141st Strategic Wing, stationed at Glasgow Air Force Base, Montana. It was inactivated on 1 February 1963.

History

World War II

Initial organization and training
The squadron was activated at Barksdale Field, Louisiana on 1 March 1942, as the 326th Bombardment Squadron, one of the four original squadrons of the 92nd Bombardment Group. Later that month it moved to MacDill Field, Florida and trained with Boeing B-17 Flying Fortresses. While training in Florida, the squadron also flew antisubmarine patrols off the Florida coast. The squadron's air echelon departed Sarasota Army Air Field for Westover Field, Massachusetts on 19 June 1942, flying on to Dow Field, Maine on 29 June. The squadron then ferried their B-17s across the North Atlantic via Newfoundland starting between 12 and 15 August. They flew directly from Newfoundland to Prestwick Airport, Scotland. The 92nd Group was the first to fly their bombers non-stop across the Atlantic. Meanwhile,  the ground echelon left Bradenton on 18 July, arriving at Fort Dix, New Jersey in the New York Port of Embarkation two days later.

Operations in the European Theater
The buildup of Eighth Air Force in England required the establishment of a combat crew replacement and training center, but a lack of qualified personnel and aircraft hampered its development.  As a result, the decision was made to use the 92nd Group and its squadrons as a temporary crew training unit, acting as the main component of what became the 11th Combat Crew Replacement Center Group.  However, the 92d was the first group to arrive in England with improved B-17Fs, and with the training mission came an exchange of these newer models for the older B-17Es of the 97th Bombardment Group to use in training.  On 6 September, to provide the squadron with combat experience, it flew its first combat mission against Meaulte, France.  Although remaining a replacement crew training unit until May 1943, the squadron initially flew occasional combat missions.  In January 1943, he squadron moved to RAF Alconbury.

In May 1943, the squadron's training mission was transferred and the 326th began flying combat missions.   Through May 1944 its targets included shipyards at Kiel, ball bearing plants at Schweinfurt, submarine pens at Wilhelmshaven, a tire manufacturing plant at Hannover, airfields near Paris, an aircraft factory at Nantes and a magnesium mine in Norway.

The squadron earned a Distinguished Unit Citation on 11 January 1944, when it successfully bombed aircraft manufacturing factories in central Germany despite adverse weather, a lack of fighter protection and heavy flak.  It participated in Big Week, the intensive attack against German aircraft industry in late February 1944.  It took part in Operation Crossbow, attacks on launch sites for V-1 flying bombs and V-2 rockets.  It struck airfields and industrial sites in France, Belgium, the Netherlands, and Germany.  After October 1944 it concentrated on transportation and oil industry targets.

In addition to its strategic bombing mission, the squadron flew interdiction and air support missions.  During Operation Overlord, the Normandy invasion, it attacked coastal defenses, transportation junctions and marshalling yards near the beachhead. It provided air support for Operation Cobra, the Allied breakout at Saint Lo, It bombed bridges and gun positions to support Operation Market Garden, the airborne attacks in the Netherlands near Arnhem, to secure bridgeheads across the Rhine in September.  During the Battle of the Bulge, from December 1944 to January 1945, it attacked bridges and marshalling yards near the target area.  During Operation Varsity, the airborne assault across the Rhine, it provided cover by bombing airfields near the drop zone.  It flew its last combat mission on 25 April 1945, when the 92nd Group led the entire Eighth Air Force formation.

Following V-E Day, the squadron moved to Istres Air Base, France, where it participated in the Green Project, transporting troops returning to the United States, flying them to Cazes Field in Morocco until September, returning French servicemen to France on return trips.  During the winter it flew displaced Greek nationals from Munich to Athens.  It was inactivated in France on 28 February 1946 and its remaining personnel were absorbed into elements of the 306th Bombardment Group at Lechfeld Air Base, Germany.

Strategic Air Command

Reactivated as a Strategic Air Command (SAC) Boeing B-29 Superfortress squadron in July 1946.  Performed strategic bombardment training and operations directed by SAC.  In March 1948 deployed to England and Germany to support the Berlin Airlift.

Deployed to Far East Air Forces and flying combat missions over North Korea.  Under control of the FEAF Bomber Command (Provisional) until 20 October, the squadron bombed factories, refineries, iron works, hydroelectric plants, airfields, bridges, tunnels, troop concentrations, barracks, marshalling yards, road junctions, rail lines, supply dumps, docks, vehicles and other strategic and interdiction targets.

Released from combat by General MacArthur on 20 October 1950.  Many of the still operational B-29s remained with Far East Air Forces to serve on with the 19th and 307th Bombardment Groups at Kadena Air Base, Okinawa; and the 98th Bombardment Group at Yokota Air Base, Japan.  Returned without most personnel and equipment to Spokane Air Force Base, Washington in late October and November 1950.

Re-equipped with Convair B-36 Peacemaker intercontinental strategic bomber in 1951.  Engaged in training operations on a worldwide scale.  Deployed in August 1953 to the Far East was to survey suitable bases for B-36 use and to reinforce the Korean armistice of July 1953. Twenty B-36D aircraft landed at Kadena Air Base, for Operation Big Stick. B-36 aircraft visited Yokota Air Base and Anderson Air Force Base, Guam. The squadron returned to Fairchild after a short stay.  Redeployed to Guam 14 October 1954 for 90 days, which established a succession of deployed B-36 squadrons to maintain a heavy bomber presence in the western Pacific. Returned for its second 90-day deployment in April 1956.

During the 1956 deployment to Guam, four 327th B-36J aircraft were deployed to [[Hickam Air Force Base Hawaii. They would support the 1956 nuclear tests at Eniwetok.  On 15 April 1952, a borrowed 327th Bombardment Squadron B-36 with a 326th crew crashed on takeoff, killing 15 crewmen, 2 survived, severely burned. In May 1955, the 326th was awarded the Air Force Outstanding Unit Award for Operation Big Stick.

In July 1960, the 326th began the movement of the squadron’s personnel, aircraft and equipment to Glasgow Air Force Base, Montana. This was the completion of the dispersal program to reduce vulnerability of large (three squadron 45 B-52) unit at one base. The 326th moved to Glasgow AFB MT in February 1961. On setup at Glasgow, the squadron resumed alert duties and training under the command of the 4141st Strategic Wing.

In an effort to honor heritage units of the past, on 1 February 1963, the 4141st Wing and 326th Squadron were inactivated when SAC inactivated its strategic wings, replacing them with permanent wings. Squadron was inactivated with its, aircraft and personnel reassigned to the 322d Bombardment Squadron.

Lineage
 Constituted as the 326th Bombardment Squadron (Heavy) on 28 January 1942
 Activated on 1 March 1942
 Redesignated 326 Bombardment Squadron, Heavy on 29 September 1944
 Inactivated on 28 February 1946
 Redesignated 326 Bombardment Squadron, Very Heavy on 15 July 1946
 Activated on 4 August 1946
 Redesignated 326 Bombardment Squadron, Medium on 28 May 1948
 Redesignated 326 Bombardment Squadron, Heavy' on 16 June 1951
 Discontinued and inactivated on 1 February 1963

Assignments
 92d Bombardment Group, 1 March 1942 – 28 February 1946
 92d Bombardment Group, 4 August 1946 (attached to 92d Bombardment Wing after 16 February 1951)
 92d Bombardment Wing (later 92d Strategic Aerospace Wing, 92d Bombardment Wing), 16 June 1952
 4141st Strategic Wing, 1 September 1958 – 1 February 1963

Stations

 Barksdale Field, Louisiana, 1 March 1942
 MacDill Field, Florida, 26 March 1942
 Sarasota Army Air Field, Florida, 18 May–18 July 1942
 RAF Bovingdon (AAF-112), England, 18 August 1942
 RAF Alconbury (AAF-102), England, 6 January 1943
 RAF Podington (AAF-109), England, 15 September 1943
 Istres Air Base (AAF 196), (Y-17), France, 12 June 1945 – 28 February 1946

 Fort Worth Army Air Field, Texas, 4 August 1946
 Smoky Hill Army Air Field, Kansas, 26 October 1946
 Spokane Army Air Field (later Spokane Air Force Base, Fairchild Air Force Base), Washington, 20 June 1947 (deployed to Yokota Air Base, Japan, 9 July–29 October 1950
 Glasgow Air Force Base, Montana, 1 September 1958 – 1 February 1963

Aircraft
 Boeing B-17 Flying Fortress, 1942–1946
 Boeing B-29 Superfortress, 1946, 1947–1951
 Convair B-36 Peacemaker, 1951–1957
 Boeing B-52 Stratofortress, 1957–1963

See also

 List of B-52 Units of the United States Air Force

References

Notes
 Explanatory notes

 Citations

Bibliography

 
 
 
 
 
 
 

Military units and formations established in 1942
Bombardment squadrons of the United States Air Force
Strategic bombing squadrons of the United States Army Air Forces
United States Air Force units and formations in the Korean War